Goydərə may refer to:
Gëydere, Azerbaijan
Goydərə, Gobustan, Azerbaijan
Göydərə, Azerbaijan